Graydon Oliver (born June 15, 1978) is a retired American professional tennis player. A doubles specialist, he won four titles during his career.

Upon retiring from the tour, Oliver took a job in the energy sector (Leor Energy), working for an exploration and production company.  In 2010, Oliver took a job in the financial sector for a company in Texas.

Doubles finals

Wins (8)

Runners-up (9)

References

External links
 
 
 Illinois Fighting Illini profile page

1978 births
Living people
American male tennis players
Illinois Fighting Illini men's tennis players
Tennis players from Miami
Tennis players from Tampa, Florida
Doping cases in tennis